Deployment may refer to:
 Military deployment, the movement of armed forces and their logistical support
 Software deployment, all of the activities that make a software system  available for use
 System deployment, transforming a mechanical, electrical, or computer system from a packaged to an operational state